Attack from the Sea is a 1953 Soviet biographical war film directed by Mikhail Romm and starring Ivan Pereverzev, Gennadi Yudin and Vladimir Druzhnikov.

The film is about the career of the Russian naval officer Fyodor Ushakov and the Siege of Corfu (1798–99). It was made by the Moscow-based Ministry of Cinematography by the production unit Mosfilm, in Agfa-color, renamed Sovcolor by Moscow. It is the sequel to Admiral Ushakov, released the same year.

Cast
 Ivan Pereverzev as Adm. Fedor Fedorovich Ushakov  
 Gennadi Yudin as Capt. Dmitri Nikolayevich Senyavin  
 Vladimir Druzhnikov as Capt. Vasilyev  
 Aleksey Alekseev as Capt. Yegor Metaksa  
 Sergei Bondarchuk as Tikhon Alexeyevich Prokofiev 
 Nikolai Khryashchikov as Khovrin, old sailor  
 Mikhail Pugovkin as Piroshkov  
 Georgiy Yumatov as Ermolaev  
 Vladimir Balashov as Capt. Grigori (Henry) Baillie 
 Pavel Volkov as Medical Doctor  
 Pyotr Lyubeshkin 
 Sergey Petrov as Gen. Aleksandr Vasilyevich Suvorov 
 Pavel Pavlenko as Czar Pavel I  
 Nikolai Svobodin as Mordovzev  
 Mikhail Nazvanov as Czar Alexander I  
 Ivan Solovyov as Lord Admiral Horatio Nelson  
 Iosif Tolchanov as Lord William Hamilton  
 Yelena Kuzmina as Emma Hamilton  
 V. Tumanov as Foot  
 Nikolay Volkov as Sir William Pitt Jr.  
 Sergei Martinson as King Ferdinand  
 Ada Vojtsik as Queen Carolina  
 Valeriy Lekarev as Napoleon Bonaparte I  
 Emmanuil Geller as Ambassador Misharu  
 Boris Bibikov as Spencer Smith  
 G. Rozhdestvensky as Mordovtsev 
 Evgeni Agurov as Englishman  
 Georgiy Budarov   
 Lev Fenin   
 Lev Frichinsky as Turchaninov  
 Nikolai Kryukov   
 Gotlib Roninson  
 Georgi Shapovalov as Russian Army officer  
 Pavel Shpringfeld as Orfano  
 Semyon Svashenko as Russian Army officer

References

Bibliography 
 Rollberg, Peter. Historical Dictionary of Russian and Soviet Cinema. Scarecrow Press, 2008.

External links 
 

1950s war drama films
Soviet war drama films
Russian war drama films
1950s biographical drama films
Soviet biographical drama films
Russian biographical drama films
1950s Russian-language films
Films directed by Mikhail Romm
Films scored by Aram Khachaturian
Films set in 1798
Films set in 1799
Films set in the 19th century
Films set in Greece
Seafaring films
Depictions of Napoleon on film
Cultural depictions of Horatio Nelson
Cultural depictions of Paul I of Russia
Cultural depictions of William Pitt the Younger
Soviet epic films